= National Program for Adaptation of Ukrainian Legislation to the Law of the European Union =

The National Program for the Adaptation of Ukrainian Legislation to the Law of the European Union (EU acquis) is a state strategic document approved by Resolution of the Cabinet of Ministers of Ukraine No. 438 of April 1, 2026, which forms the institutional and legal basis for determining the content, goals and objectives of the adaptation of Ukrainian legislation to European Union law within the framework of negotiations on Ukraine's accession to the European Union .

An integral part of the National Program is a number of documents that define an action plan in critical areas of public administration. Their implementation is a prerequisite for closing the relevant negotiation chapters:

- Rule of Law Roadmap
- Roadmap for public administration reform
- Roadmap for the functioning of democratic institutions
- Action Plan for the Protection of the Rights of Persons Belonging to National Minorities (Communities) of Ukraine .

The National Program includes about 1,875 tasks, which involve the implementation of more than 1,600 acts of EU law.

== History ==
The National Program became a logical stage in the implementation of Ukraine's obligations stipulated in the European Commission's negotiating framework, which was approved by the decision of the Council of the European Union of June 21, 2024.

The document was formed based on the results of a bilateral screening of Ukrainian and EU legislation, and is also based on benchmarks (conditions) set by the European Commission. The National Program was also based on reports on Ukraine's progress within the EU enlargement package.

On December 30, 2025, the Interdepartmental Working Group on Ensuring the Negotiation Process on Ukraine's Accession to the European Union and Adapting Ukrainian Legislation to European Union Law preliminarily approved the draft National Program.

The government has also created an information system for monitoring the implementation of Ukraine's commitments in the field of European integration, "Pulse of Accession", which is designed to track the implementation of the measures of the National Program and other related strategic documents.

On April 1, 2026, the Cabinet of Ministers of Ukraine adopted a corresponding resolution, officially approving the National Program. Monitoring and evaluation of its implementation will be carried out through a special information system "Entry Pulse".

The adoption of the National Program was accompanied by the recognition of previous government acts in the field of implementation of the Association Agreement as invalid, including Resolutions of the Cabinet of Ministers of Ukraine No. 447 of May 31, 2017 and No. 1106 of October 25, 2017.

Unlike previous adaptation programs, focused primarily on fulfilling obligations under the Association Agreement between Ukraine and the European Union, the National Program is directly related to the negotiation architecture of EU accession and covers all negotiation chapters of the EU acquis.

== Rule of Law Roadmap ==
The Rule of Law Roadmap is a comprehensive strategic document that defines a set of reforms within the framework of the negotiation process for Ukraine's membership in the EU under negotiating Chapters 23 and 24. This document is one of the key prerequisites for the opening of official negotiations on Ukraine's accession to the EU within Cluster 1 "Fundamentals of the EU Accession Process", which opens first and closes last.

The document identifies 124 strategic outcomes that Ukraine aims to achieve, as well as 529 key measures aimed at their implementation, with clear deadlines and responsible state bodies. Its implementation will be an important step on the path to Ukraine's membership in the European Union, strengthen the trust of international partners and ensure the sustainability of democratic transformations.
